Una vida por otra (English: One Life for Another) is a 1932 Mexican film, directed by John H. Auer in his directorial debut.

Plot
The film tells the story of Lucia, who needs money for the treatment of her sick mother. She watches the murder of Joaquin, who blackmailed his former mistress Aurora. Aurora pays Lucia to take the blame. She reports the crime to the police claiming herself to be guilty, but refuses to explain details of the crime. However, when the money arrives at her mother, it no longer helps as she dies. Lucia's lawyer, Rafael, finds out the truth and ultimately resolves to clarify the incident in court, even though Aurora is his wife. When her act is revealed, Aurora commits suicide.

Cast
Nancy Torres as Lucia Zamora
Julio Villarreal as Rafael Icaza
Gloria Iturbe as Aurora
Rosita Arriaga as Doña Lupita
Joaquín Coss as Don Pancho Martínez y Martínez
Alfredo del Diestro as Agente del ministerio público
Sofía Álvarez as Sofía Arellano
Víctor Urruchúa as Novio de Lucía
Emma Roldán as Consuelo - vecina
Ricardo Carti as Doctor González
Jorge Peón
Carlos López 
Jesús Melgarejo
Beatriz Ramos 
Conchita Gentil Arcos

Production
The film was produced by the companies Cia Nacional Productora de Pelicula and Inter-Americas Cinema. In the United States, Una vida por otra was distributed in Spanish by Cinexport Distributing and Jack Lustberg. John H. Auer was from Hungary and filmed foreign-language films in Hollywood before coming to Mexico. Since he did not speak Spanish, he was assisted by Fernando de Fuentes, with whom he collaborated in dialogue direction and storyboards.

References

Bibliography

External links

1932 films
1932 drama films
Mexican drama films
1930s Spanish-language films
Films directed by John H. Auer